Matthew Parish (born 30 November 1971) is a British rower. He competed in the men's eight event at the 1996 Summer Olympics.

References

External links
 

1971 births
Living people
British male rowers
Olympic rowers of Great Britain
Rowers at the 1996 Summer Olympics
Rowers from Greater London